The Varsity Theatre was a single-screen Mission Revival movie palace located on University Avenue in Palo Alto, California. The building is notable for its distinctive neon marquee and elongated, colonnade-lined courtyard.

History
Following its closure as a theater in 1994, the space was converted into a Borders Bookstore. The chain preserved the exterior and most of the original interior of the building. When Borders was liquidated in 2011, the building remained vacant until 2015. In 2015 Gensler renovated the building to accommodate HanaHaus, a community workspace, and a Blue Bottle Cafe.

References

External links
Cinema Treasures Varsity Theatre profile
Roadside Architecture Includes information and recent images of the Varsity's exterior
Waymarking Building profile

Cinemas and movie theaters in California
Buildings and structures in Palo Alto, California
Former cinemas in the United States
Event venues established in 1927
Mission Revival architecture in California
1927 establishments in California